This is a recap of the 1972 season for the Professional Bowlers Association (PBA) Tour.  It was the tour's 14th season, and consisted of 32 events. With three victories, including a major at the BPAA U.S. Open, Don Johnson repeated as PBA Player of the Year, becoming just the second multiple winner of the award (after Billy Hardwick). With his third victory of the season at the Brunswick World Open, Johnson also joined Dick Weber as the PBA Tour's only 20-time winners to date.

Mike Durbin captured the season's second major at the Firestone Tournament of Champions, while Johnny Guenther was the victor at the PBA National Championship.

Tournament schedule

References

External links
1972 Season Schedule

Professional Bowlers Association seasons
1972 in bowling